To celebrate 10 years of professional rugby union, Australian Rugby celebrated the occasion with the announcement in 2005 of the Wallaby Team of the Decade.   A Judging panel of 30 journalists and commentators voted on a starting XV and a bench, with 6 players (in italics below) being unanimous selections, the rest being selected in their respective positions.

The only five Australian players to have won 2 Rugby World Cups (1991 & 1999) have all been selected: Phil Kearns, John Eales, Tim Horan, Jason Little and Dan Crowley.

As of August 2015, George Smith is the only player still active.

Team

External links
 Australian Rugby Website, Wallabies Team of the Decade
 Press Release - Australian Rugby

Australia national rugby union team
2005 in Australian rugby union